Tat Momoli is a census-designated place located in Pinal County, Arizona, United States, on the Tohono Oʼodham Indian Reservation. As of the Census of 2010 it had a population of 10 with a population density of 4.16 people per km2.

Geography 
According to the United States Census Bureau, Tat Momoli has a total area of 2.41 km2, all  land.

Demographics

According to the Census of 2010, there were 10 people living in Tat Momoli. The population density was 4.16 people/km2. Of the 10 residents, Tat Momoli was composed of 10% whites, 60% American Indians or Alaska Natives, and 30% were some other race. Out of the total population 30% were Hispanic or Latino of any race.

References 

Census-designated places in Pinal County, Arizona
Tohono O'odham Nation